The dapaqin (大琶琴) is a modern bowed string instrument originating in China. It is the bass variant of the paqin. Its name literally means "big paqin". Its tone is similar to that double bass.

See also 
 Paqin
 Chinese music
 List of Chinese musical instruments

References

Chinese musical instruments